Ovidy Obvious Karuru (born January 23, 1989) is a Zimbabwean professional footballer who plays as a midfielder. He is currently playing for the Zimbabwe national team.

Club career
Karuru began his career with Masvingo United F.C. and joined Newcastle United F.C. for a trial in March 2008. After two years in the senior side for Masvingo United he joined Gunners Football Club Harare in January 2009.

After only a half-year with Harare, he was sold to Ligue 1 team US Boulogne in the summer of 2009. With Boulogne he relegated twice in three seasons, ending up in the Championnat National in 2012, when he moved to OH Leuven in the Belgian Pro League. He made his league debut for the club on 15 September 2012 in a 1–0 home loss against Zulte Waregem replacing Evariste Ngolok in the 72nd minute. He scored his first league goal for the club on 20 October 2012 in a 4–1 home victory over Club Brugge. After being brought on in the 46th minute for Derick Ogbu, Karuru scored the fourth and final goal of the match for his side in the 81st minute. The assist came from Ebrahima Sawaneh. He joined Chiefs on 22 July 2014 as a free agent after opting not to renew his contract with OH Leuven, who were relegated from the Jupiler League at the end of the 2013–14 season.

Karuru joined Kaizer Chiefs and played in a pre-season friendly against Chippa United in which Chiefs won 4–2 in Port Elizabeth. Karuru received his work permit from the South African Department of Home Affairs on 22 August 2014 after a month-long delay. He was released by Kaizer Chiefs on 31 May 2016.

In February 2017, Karuru was picked up by South African club AmaZulu F.C. on a one-and-a-half year deal. His league debut for the club came on 15 February 2017 in a 2–1 home loss to Mthatha Bucks F.C. He was subbed on for Zola Jingxi in the 61st minute. His first league goal for the club came on 19 April 2017 in a 3–1 away win over Royal Eagles F.C. His goal, scored in the 69th minute, made the score 2–1 in favour of AmaZulu.

On 29 January 2022, Karuru joined Saudi Arabian club Al-Shoulla.

International career
Karuru is a former member of the Zimbabwe national under-20 football team and was with them as part of the 2009 African Nations Championship, he was also given captaincy of the team.

Career statistics

Club
.

International
.

International goals
Scores and results list Zimbabwe's goal tally first.

Honours

Club
Masvingo United
Zimbabwean Independence Trophy (2): 2006, 2007

Kaizer Chiefs
South African Premier Division (1): 2014–15
MTN 8 (1): 2015

References

External links

1989 births
Living people
Zimbabwean footballers
Zimbabwe international footballers
Association football midfielders
Sportspeople from Harare
Expatriate footballers in Belgium
Expatriate footballers in France
Expatriate footballers in Saudi Arabia
Expatriate soccer players in South Africa
Zimbabwean expatriate sportspeople in Saudi Arabia
Zimbabwean expatriates in South Africa
Zimbabwe Premier Soccer League players
Ligue 1 players
Ligue 2 players
Championnat National players
Belgian Pro League players
South African Premier Division players
National Football League (South Africa) players
Saudi First Division League players
Masvingo United F.C. players
Gunners F.C. players
US Boulogne players
Oud-Heverlee Leuven players
Kaizer Chiefs F.C. players
AmaZulu F.C. players
Stellenbosch F.C. players
Black Leopards F.C. players
Al-Shoulla FC players
2019 Africa Cup of Nations players
Zimbabwe youth international footballers
2009 African Nations Championship players
Zimbabwe A' international footballers